Scott Kosmachuk (born January 24, 1994) is a Canadian professional ice hockey forward who is currently playing in the Liiga with HC TPS. He was originally drafted 70th overall in the 2012 NHL Entry Draft by the Winnipeg Jets.

Playing career
Kosmachuk was born and raised in the Greater Toronto Area and played junior hockey with the Ontario Hockey League's Guelph Storm.  In his fourth and final season with the Storm, Kosmachuk finished third in league scoring with 101 points and helped lead the team to the OHL championship.  The Storm advanced as far as the 2014 Memorial Cup final, which they lost to the Edmonton Oil Kings.

The Winnipeg Jets drafted Kosmachuk in the third round of the 2012 NHL Entry Draft, and returned him to the Storm for his final two years of junior eligibility.  After attending his first training camp with the Jets in 2014, Kosmachuk was assigned to the St. John's IceCaps, the Jets' American Hockey League affiliate for the 2014–15 season. The IceCaps relocated to Winnipeg the following summer, where Kosmachuk played the next season with the Manitoba Moose.

During the 2015–16 season, on March 8, 2016, the Jets recalled Kosmachuk on an emergency basis to replace the injured Joel Armia. With the Jets out of playoff contention he made his NHL debut that evening against the Nashville Predators. In his third games he recorded his first NHL point in recording the game-winning assist in a 3-2 victory over the Colorado Avalanche on March 13, 2016.

At the conclusion of the 2016–17 season, Kosmachuk was not tendered a qualifying offer by the Jets, releasing him to free agency. On September 13, 2017, Kosmachuk agreed to a one-year AHL contract with the Hartford Wolf Pack. He was also invited to partake in NHL parent affiliate, the New York Rangers training camp. After attending the Rangers training camp, Kosmachuk was returned to the Wolf Pack to begin the 2017–18 season. Used in a top six offensive role, Kosmachuk rebounded offensively ranking second on the team with 15 goals and 42 points in 70 games.

On July 2, 2018, as a free agent Kosmachuk drew NHL consideration, and agreed to a one-year, two-way contract with the Colorado Avalanche. In the 2018–19 season, Kosmachuk played exclusively with the Avalanche's affiliate, the Colorado Eagles, for their inaugural season in the AHL. Among the Eagles top-9 forward, Kosmachuk posted 12 goals and 23 points in 54 games. As an impending free agent, Kosmachuk's expiring NHL rights were included in a trade by the Avalanche, along with 2020 second and third round picks, to the Washington Capitals in exchange for André Burakovsky on June 28, 2019. 

As an unsigned free agent over the summer, Kosmachuk belatedly signed abroad during the 2019–20 season, agreeing to a contract with German club, Augsburger Panther of the DEL, on November 21, 2019. Following the season, Kosmachuk remained in Europe, continuing in the neighbouring Austrian Hockey League with EC VSV.

On June 9, 2022 Kosmachuk signed with HC TPS of the Liiga for the following 2022-23 season.

International play

Kosmachuk was selected to play for Team Canada at the 2012 IIHF World U18 Championships in the Czech Republic.

Career statistics

Regular season and playoffs

International

References

External links

1994 births
Living people
Augsburger Panther players
Canadian ice hockey forwards
Colorado Eagles players
Guelph Storm players
Hartford Wolf Pack players
Ice hockey people from Ontario
Manitoba Moose players
Sportspeople from Richmond Hill, Ontario
St. John's IceCaps players
HC TPS players
EC VSV players
Winnipeg Jets draft picks
Winnipeg Jets players